Sir (William) Roger Tomkys , (born 15 March 1937) is a retired British diplomat, and former Master of Pembroke College, at the University of Cambridge.

He was educated at Bradford Grammar School and graduated from Balliol College, Oxford in 1960.

Tomkys learned Arabic at the Middle East Centre for Arabic Studies in Lebanon, and immediately began his diplomatic career with a posting in Amman, Jordan, where he served from 1962-1964. He served as British Ambassador to Bahrain (1981–1984), and Syria (1984–1986), and as High Commissioner in Nairobi from 1990-1992.

Tomkys served as Master of Pembroke College from 1992–2004; at Cambridge he also served as Chairman of the Centre of International Studies, as well as the Centre for Middle East and Islamic Studies. He also chaired the Arab British Chamber of Commerce (ABCC) from 2004-2010.

Tomkys was knighted by the Queen in 1991.

References 

1937 births
Living people
People educated at Bradford Grammar School
Alumni of Balliol College, Oxford
Masters of Pembroke College, Cambridge
Ambassadors of the United Kingdom to Bahrain
Ambassadors of the United Kingdom to Syria
High Commissioners of the United Kingdom to Kenya
Knights Commander of the Order of St Michael and St George